Cindy Kyounga Chung (born 1975) is an American lawyer serving as a United States circuit judge of the United States Court of Appeals for the Third Circuit. She previously served as United States attorney for the Western District of Pennsylvania from 2021 to 2023.

Early life and education 
Chung was born in 1975 in Omaha, Nebraska. She earned a Bachelor of Arts from Yale University in 1997 and a Juris Doctor from Columbia Law School in 2002.

Career 

From 2002 to 2003, Chung served as a law clerk for Judge Myron H. Thompson of the United States District Court for the Middle District of Alabama. She then joined the Manhattan District Attorney's office in 2003, serving as an assistant district attorney until 2007 and as investigation counsel in the Official Corruption Unit from 2007 to 2009. From 2009 to 2014, Chung served as a trial attorney in the United States Department of Justice Civil Rights Division.

From 2014 to 2021, she served as assistant United States attorney for the Western District of Pennsylvania, ultimately serving as deputy chief of the Major Crimes Division.

Notable cases 

In 2007, Chung prosecuted rapper Foxy Brown for violating probation after assaulting two manicurists.

In 2011, Chung was involved in prosecuting Frankie Maybee and Sean Popejoy, the first defendants to be sentenced under the Shepherd-Byrd Hate Crimes Prevention Act.

United States attorney 
On October 27, 2021, President Joe Biden nominated Chung to be the United States attorney for the Western District of Pennsylvania. On November 19, 2021, her nomination was confirmed in the United States Senate by voice vote. She was sworn into office on November 23, 2021, by Chief Judge Mark R. Hornak. She resigned on February 17, 2023 to become a circuit judge of the Third Circuit.

Federal judicial service 
On July 12, 2022, President Joe Biden nominated Chung to serve as a United States circuit judge of the United States Court of Appeals for the Third Circuit. President Biden nominated Chung to the seat vacated by Judge D. Brooks Smith, who assumed senior status on December 4, 2021. Chung was unanimously rated "well qualified" for the circuit judgeship by the American Bar Association's Standing Committee on the Federal Judiciary. 

On September 7, 2022, a hearing on her nomination was held before the Senate Judiciary Committee. During her confirmation hearing, she was questioned by Senator Chuck Grassley about her judicial philosophy. A debate ensued between Senators Sheldon Whitehouse, Mazie Hirono, and Mike Lee about the term "originalism". On September 28, 2022, her nomination was reported out of committee by a 12–10 vote. On January 3, 2023, her nomination was returned to the president under Rule XXXI, Paragraph 6 of the United States Senate; she was renominated later the same day. On February 2, 2023, her nomination was reported out of committee by an 11–9 vote. On February 9, 2023, the Senate invoked cloture on her nomination by a 52–46 vote. On February 13, 2023, her nomination was confirmed by a 50–44 vote. She received her judicial commission on February 21, 2023. She is the first Asian-American to ever serve on the Third Circuit.

References

External links 

1975 births
Living people
21st-century American women judges
21st-century American judges
21st-century American women lawyers
21st-century American lawyers
American jurists of Korean descent
Assistant United States Attorneys
Columbia Law School alumni
Judges of the United States Court of Appeals for the Third Circuit
Lawyers from Omaha, Nebraska
Pennsylvania lawyers
United States Attorneys for the Western District of Pennsylvania
United States court of appeals judges appointed by Joe Biden
Yale University alumni